Jay Chapman may refer to:

Jay Chapman (physician), American physician and forensic pathologist
Jay Chapman (soccer) (born 1994), Canadian soccer player
Jaye Chapman (born 1987), American baseball player